Okenia rhinorma is a species of sea slug, specifically a dorid nudibranch, a marine gastropod mollusc in the family Goniodorididae.

Distribution
This species was described from Dar es Salaam, Tanzania.

Description
This Okenia has very large rhinophores. It is mostly opaque white, with lines and patches of purple and orange.

Ecology
The diet of this species is unknown but probably consists of tunicates.

References

Goniodorididae
Gastropods described in 2007